The Secrétariat aux affaires autochtones (SAA) is an agency of the government of Quebec. Its stated mission as of 2010 is to be the "primary agency responsible for ensuring communication and contact between Native peoples and the Government of Québec."

The secretariat is guided by a set of fifteen principles approved by the National Assembly of Quebec and the Executive Council of Quebec in 1983. The first three principles read as follows:

"Québec recognizes that the aboriginal peoples of Québec constitute distinct nations, entitled to their own culture, language, traditions and customs, as well as having the right to determine, by themselves, the development of their own identity."
"It also recognizes the right of aboriginal nations, within the framework of Québec legislation, to own and to control the lands that are attributed to them."
"These rights are to be exercised by them as part of the Québec community and hence could not imply rights of sovereignty that could affect the territorial integrity of Québec."

The secretariat is overseen by the minister responsible for Native Affairs. The current minister is Geoffrey Kelley.

References

Quebec government departments and agencies